Acela Corridor may refer to:

 Northeast Corridor, a train line for Amtrak's Acela trains
 Northeast Megalopolis, the megalopolis of cities from Boston to Washington that the Acela train serves